The Lister Knobbly is a lightweight sports racing car, designed, developed and built by the British car manufacturer Lister, which was originally produced between 1957 and 1959. The nickname "Knobbly" came from the distinctive but odd curved design of the bodywork, giving the car a unique shape. It was powered by either Jaguar straight-6 or a larger Chevrolet small-block engine.

References

Lister Knobbly
Cars of England
Jaguar vehicles
Rear-wheel-drive vehicles
Cars introduced in 1957
Sports racing cars
1950s cars